Robert J. Blanchflower (born June 8, 1990) is a former American football tight end. He was drafted by the Pittsburgh Steelers in the seventh round of the 2014 NFL Draft. He played college football at Massachusetts.

High school career
In high school, Blanchflower was on the football and basketball team and was teammates with current Philadelphia Eagles tight end Richard Rodgers II. He also played with former Denver Broncos practice squad tight end, Dan Light, at St. John's, for the football team.

Professional career
Blanchflower was drafted by the Pittsburgh Steelers with the 230th pick in the 2014 NFL Draft. On August 30, 2014, Blanchflower was among the final cuts for the Steelers. The next day, he was added to their practice squad. On January 5, 2015, the Steelers signed Blanchflower to a reserve/future contract. On August 6, 2015, he was waived/injured to make room for tight end Ray Hamilton. After he cleared waivers, he was placed on their injured reserve, ending his season. On February 16, 2016, the Steelers released Blanchflower.

References

External links
Pittsburgh Steelers bio 
UMass Minutemen bio

1990 births
Living people
People from Leominster, Massachusetts
Sportspeople from Worcester County, Massachusetts
Players of American football from Massachusetts
American football tight ends
UMass Minutemen football players
Pittsburgh Steelers players